Allan Wipper Wells  (born 3 May 1952) is a Scottish former track and field sprinter who became the 100 metres Olympic champion at the 1980 Summer Olympics in Moscow. Within a fortnight of that, he also took on and beat America's best sprinters at an invitational meeting in Koblenz. In 1981, Wells was both the IAAF Golden Sprints and IAAF World Cup gold medallist. He is also a three-time European Cup gold medallist among many other sprint successes.

He was a multiple medallist for his native Scotland at the Commonwealth Games, winning two golds at the 1978 Commonwealth Games and completing a 100 metres/200 metres sprint double at the 1982 Commonwealth Games. Wells also recorded the fastest British 100/200 times in 1978, 1979, 1980, 1981, 1982, 1983 and 100 m in 1984.

Wells remains the last white male athlete without African ancestry to win the 100 metres at the Olympics.

Biography

Early years and long jump
Born in Edinburgh, Wells was educated at Fernieside Primary School and then Liberton High School. He left school at age 15 to begin an engineering apprenticeship. Wells was initially a triple jumper and long jumper and crowned Scottish indoor long jump champion in 1974.

Commonwealth and European sprint titles
He began concentrating on sprint events in 1976. In 1977 he won the AAA's Indoor 60 metres title, and won his first of seven outdoor Scottish sprint titles.

In the 1978 season his times and victories continued to improve, he clocked a new British record at Gateshead 10.29, beating Don Quarrie and James Sanford, he also won the UK 100/200 Championships. At the Commonwealth Games in Edmonton, Alberta, Canada, he won the gold medal in the 200 m and silver in the 100 m. He also won the 4 × 100 m running the first leg with Drew McMaster, David Jenkins and Cameron Sharp running the other three legs.

This success continued in 1979, when he won the European Cup 200 metres in Turin, Italy, beating the new World record holder Pietro Mennea on his home ground; he also finished 3rd in the 100 metres.

Wells also beat Houston Mcteer in the 100m at Gateshead.

1980 – Olympic success and the showdown in Koblenz

At the start of the 1980 season, Wells won the AAA's 100 metres, then went to the Côte d'Azur to finish preparing for the 1980 Moscow Olympic Games. Wells never used starting blocks, until a rule change forced him to do so for the Moscow Olympics. Prior to the Olympics he was put under pressure by Margaret Thatcher in the boycott of the games led by the Americans. Wells responded by declining all media requests. His Olympic participation was threatened by chronic back pain that arrived 2½ weeks before the games began. Each day he underwent four exhausting treatment sessions that left him too tired to train. Instead when not undergoing treatment he spent his time relaxing.

In Moscow, 28-year-old Wells qualified for the final, with a new British record 10.11 s, where he faced pre-race favourite Silvio Leonard of Cuba. By 60 metres the field were fading, and by 80 metres the race was between Leonard on the inside and Wells on the outside. Wells edged ahead, but Leonard drew even again. With seven metres to go Wells began an extreme lean which allowed his head and shoulder to cross the finish line  before Leonard's chest in a photo finish; both men were given a final time of 10.25 s. Wells became the oldest Olympic 100 m champion at that time at the age of 28 years 83 days. 

The 200 m final was another close affair. Wells from lane 7, exploded out of the blocks and ran a spectacular turn making up the stagger on Mennea to his outside after only 50 metres. Coming out of the turn he had a two-metre lead over Leonard, with Quarrie close behind in third while Mennea looking fully eclipsed. But Mennea shifted gears in the straight and caught Wells with 10 metres to go. Wells attempted a final dip which had brought him victory in the 100, but he fell short, and Wells won the silver medal behind Pietro Mennea, who beat him by 0.02 s; again he set a British record of 20.21 s. He went on to break a third British record, 38.62 s, with the sprint relay team that finished fourth in the final.

In a later interview Wells said the two issues he faced prior to the games inadvertently were key factors in his success. He said in an interview to The Scotsman, "When we got to Moscow, [my wife and coach] Margot and I decided that I'd do six starts and see how it went. The fourth and fifth were full-out as if I was competing and I asked Margot what she thought: she said they were the best she'd ever seen me do. The rest had done me a lot of good, I was really fresh and committed, and those starts gave me the psychological edge over everyone else, which was key because the Olympics is all about your mental aptitude. You're at your fastest when you're relaxed and flowing (Wells' 10.11secs to qualify for the 100m final remains the Scottish record) rather than having to be aggressive."

Following the Moscow Olympics, there was some suggestion that Wells's gold medal had been devalued by the boycott of the games. Wells accepted an invitation to take on the best USA sprinters of the day, among others, at a track meeting in Cologne in West Germany. Less than two weeks after the Moscow gold, Wells (10.19) won the final in Koblenz beating Americans Stanley Floyd (10.21), Mel Lattany (10.25), Carl Lewis (10.30) and Harvey Glance (10.31). Lattany went straight over to Wells after crossing the line to say, "For what it's worth, Allan, You're the Olympic champion and you would have been Olympic champion no matter who you ran against in Moscow."

At the end of 1980, Wells was awarded Scottish Sports Personality of the Year.

1981 World Cup win

In 1981, after a successful tour of Australia and New Zealand, Wells won the European Cup 100 metres, beating East German Frank Emmelmann. Wells also finished 2nd in the 200 m.

He then demonstrated his calibre by finishing first in the "IAAF Golden sprints" in Berlin; which was the most prominent Sprint Meeting in the World that year. Although finishing second to the Frenchman Hermann Panzo by 0.01 secs in the 100, Wells emphatically won the 200 beating the top four American sprinters Mel Lattany, Jeff Phillips, Stanley Floyd, Steve Williams as well as Canada's Ben Johnson in the 100/200, 10.15/20.15 (200 wind assist) for Wells to win the event in an aggregate 30.30.

To add to this, Wells won the 100 metres at the IAAF World cup in Rome, beating the American Champion and world's fastest 100 m performer of the year which was 10.00 by Carl Lewis; Wells then finished 2nd in the world cup 200.

Afterwards, he beat the top Americans Mel Lattany and Stanley Floyd again, when he won a 200 in the Memorial Van Damme meeting in Brussels, Belgium.

Later sprinting career

In 1982, in Brisbane, Queensland, Australia, Wells won two more Commonwealth Games titles in the 100 m, a wind assisted 10.02. and then the 200 m, and a bronze medal in the relay. He shared the 200 m title with Mike McFarlane of England in a rare dead heat.

In 1983, he won his 3rd European Cup title by winning the 200 metres, beating his old adversary Pietro Mennea in London, and again took 2nd in the 100 m.

He then went on and finished 4th in both the 100/200 sprint finals at the IAAF World Championships in Helsinki.

He reached the 100 m semi-finals at the 1984 Los Angeles Olympics, and was a member of the relay team that finished 7th in the final.

Wells missed most of 1985 with injury. He was not selected for the Commonwealth Games in Edinburgh in 1986, as he had failed to compete at the Scottish trials. However, in a stunning comeback on 5 August at Gateshead, he soundly beat both Ben Johnson and Atlee Mahorn, the respective Commonwealth 100 m and 200 m champions.

Wells gained additional attention at Gateshead for being the first to be seen sporting the now common Lycra running shorts. The sight of these led to him being dubbed Wilson of the Wizard (a comic book character).

Wells was consequently selected for Stuttgart in the European championships, coming fifth in both the 100 m and 200 m finals. To add to this, he also had a victory against Linford Christie at Crystal Palace at the end of 1986. One of his last victories was winning the Inverness Highland Games 100/200 double in 1987.

Wells's later career was punctuated by injury, but, by competing into his mid-30s, he helped to set the trend for sprinters to have longer careers.

After competitive retirement

Since 1982 Wells has lived in Surrey, with his wife Margot. After retirement, he was a coach for the British bobsleigh team. Margot was also a Scottish 100/100 hurdles champion. They are now based in Guildford, Surrey where she is a fitness consultant, and Allan is a retired systems engineer.  Allan coached the Bank of Scotland specialist sprint squad alongside another former Scottish sprinter, Ian Mackie.

Wells's personal best for the 100 metres is 10.11, and for the 200 metres is 20.21, run at the Moscow 1980 games, and both are still Scottish records.

In June 2015, a BBC documentary (Panorama: Catch Me If You Can) uncovered allegations by Wells' former teammate of historical doping by the 1980 Olympic 100m champion, beginning in 1977. Allan Wells forcefully denies the allegations.

Honours and awards
Wells was appointed Member of the Order of the British Empire (MBE) in the 1982 Birthday Honours for services to athletics.

Wells was also inducted alongside Eric Liddell and Wyndham Halswelle (two other former Scottish Athletic Olympic Champions) into the Scottish Sports Hall of Fame.

Wells was the first baton holder for the Queen's Baton Relay for the 2014 Commonwealth Games, carrying the baton from Buckingham Palace in London in October 2013.

In July 2014, Allan Wells received, along with his wife Margot, an Honorary Doctorate of Science from Edinburgh Napier University.

References

External links

NO EASY WAY: Allan Wells, One Man's Olympics at National Library of Scotland's Moving Image Archive

1952 births
Living people
Scottish male sprinters
British male sprinters
Scottish male long jumpers
Sportspeople from Edinburgh
Scottish Olympic medallists
Olympic athletes of Great Britain
Olympic gold medallists for Great Britain
Olympic silver medallists for Great Britain
Athletes (track and field) at the 1980 Summer Olympics
Athletes (track and field) at the 1984 Summer Olympics
Commonwealth Games gold medallists for Scotland
Commonwealth Games silver medallists for Scotland
Commonwealth Games bronze medallists for Scotland
Commonwealth Games medallists in athletics
Athletes (track and field) at the 1978 Commonwealth Games
Athletes (track and field) at the 1982 Commonwealth Games
World Athletics Championships athletes for Great Britain
Members of the Order of the British Empire
Systems engineers
Scottish engineers
People educated at Liberton High School
Medalists at the 1980 Summer Olympics
Olympic gold medalists in athletics (track and field)
Olympic silver medalists in athletics (track and field)
Medallists at the 1978 Commonwealth Games
Medallists at the 1982 Commonwealth Games